Nanoradio  was a company based in Kista, Stockholm, Sweden. Nanoradio is a fabless semiconductor manufacturer with a main product line focus of connectivity products. The company is specializing in producing the smallest Wi-Fi chipsets by solution size on the market with extremely low power consumption. The company slogan is "Always On Wi-Fi".  Was bought by Samsung in 2012.

Company history
The company was founded in March 2004, and it is a “fabless” company. The head office is in Kista, Stockholm and with sales offices in South Korea, Taiwan, Japan, China and US as well as R&D test centre in Patras, Greece.

Operations
Nanoradio provides Wi-Fi products, adding high-speed wireless access in portable electronics, such as mobile phones, MIDS, cameras and headsets. Features include low power consumption, small size and support for audio applications.  Nanoradio's Wi-Fi is ported to most cellular platforms and operating systems.

Products
 Wi-Fi chipsets for Mobile phones and Consumer electronics

Offices
Nanoradio has its headquarters in Kista, Sweden. Moreover, the company has sales offices in five other  countries.
 Kista, Stockholm, Sweden: Global Sales Office
 Seongnam, Gyeonggi-do, South Korea, Sales Office Korea
 Yokohama, Japan, Sales Office Japan
 Mountain View, California, United States, Sales Office USA, Premier Technical Sales Inc.
 Taipei, Taiwan, Sales Office Taiwan
 Shanghai, People's Republic of China, Sales Office China
 Patras, Greece, R&D

References

External links

Electronics companies established in 2004
Fabless semiconductor companies
Companies based in Stockholm
Semiconductor companies of Sweden